William David Stits (July 26, 1931 – December 5, 2011) was an American football safety in the National Football League (NFL) for the Detroit Lions, San Francisco 49ers, Washington Redskins, and New York Giants.  He played college football at the University of California, Los Angeles and was drafted in the fourth round of the 1954 NFL Draft.

References

1931 births
2011 deaths
Sportspeople from Los Angeles County, California
American football safeties
UCLA Bruins football players
Detroit Lions players
San Francisco 49ers players
Washington Redskins players
New York Giants players
Western Conference Pro Bowl players
Deaths from dementia in California
Deaths from Alzheimer's disease
Players of American football from California
People from Lomita, California